On ibn Ali's shrine is  a shrine over Eynali mountain to north of Tabriz, Iran.

Some historians believe the shrine belongs to two Muslim clerics. Others believe the building originally was a Zoroasterian temple and the shrine's Islamic name was just a cover to protect the structure from destruction during the Muslim invasion.

See also
 Eynali
 Tabriz

Sources
 Info

External links 
 Iranian Student's Tourism & Traveling Agency, ISTTA. (English), (Persian)

Architecture in Iran
Buildings and structures in Tabriz
Mausoleums in Iran